40th Battalion may refer to:

 40th Battalion (Australia), an infantry battalion 1916–1987
 40th Battalion (Nova Scotia), CEF, a Canadian infantry battalion during World War I
 Sparrow Force (2/40th Australian Infantry Battalion), a unit of the Australian Army
 40 Commando, a unit of the United Kingdom Royal Marine Corps

See also
 40th Division (disambiguation)
 40th Brigade (disambiguation)
 40th Regiment (disambiguation)
 40th Squadron (disambiguation)